"Jitterbug Waltz" is a 1942 jazz composition by Fats Waller and initially recorded the same year by Fats Waller and His Rhythm. It was also recorded by Art Tatum, Erroll Garner, Chet Atkins, Vince Guaraldi, Butch Thompson, Al Hirt, Eric Dolphy, and David Murray.

Composition and recording
The song is in the key of E♭ major and in 3/4 time.
When Waller composed "Jitterbug Waltz" he was 38 years old and at the high point of his career as a veteran recording artist for RCA Victor, making the occasional movie appearance, broadcasting on radio, and traveling the United States and Europe on a hectic and tiring schedule. It is notable for being one of the first jazz records recorded with a Hammond organ, an instrument that gained popularity in the genre soon after.

In the 1985 British television documentary Fats Waller - This Joint is Jumpin' , Waller's son Maurice claims that Jitterbug Waltz was the first jazz waltz ever written.

References

External links
 "Jitterbug Waltz" at JazzStandards.com
  Maurice Waller documentary interview

1942 songs
Songs with music by Fats Waller
Al Hirt songs
Jazz compositions
Songs about dancing